The Lebanese German University, LGU is a higher educational institution in Jounieh, Lebanon.

Founded by the Lebanese German Association for the Promotion of Culture, a non-profit NGO, the Lebanese German University opened its doors in October 2008 after obtaining Presidential Decree number 794, dated October 5, 2007.

In the fall semester of the academic year 2008/2009, 200 students were registered at LGU in different majors. In the spring semester, students’ enrolment increased by 30% and is constantly increasing by 20% yearly. Today LGU has over 500 students, 25 administrative and logistics employees, 24 full-time professors, and 126 part-time assistant professors.

All courses are given in both English and French with modern teaching methods supported by information technologies. German is taught as an elective language course and is also sponsored by the University to encourage students to learn German culture and language.

History
The Lebanese German University is the outcome of a 35-year journey in education that started when the Lebanese German Organization for the Promotion of Culture and its Chairman, Dr. Faouzi Adaimi, set out on their long mission. In 1974 the Organization founded the Technical Institute of Paramedical Sciences (TIPS). As an institute of higher education, TIPS graduated over 2500 students in the field of healthcare and was renowned for being one of the most acknowledged institutions of higher education in Lebanon. In 1986, the German School was established for primary up to high school levels. The German Cultural House (Kulturzentrum) was founded in 1988 and has since been busy organizing concerts, conferences, art exhibitions to help promote German culture and language in Lebanon. The annual Kulturzentrum Festival is recognized by the Ministry of Tourism as an International Festival.

Academics
LGU implements the European Credit Transfer System (ECTS) in all majors. This system facilitates the transfer of students to European universities as well students’ exchange between LGU and academic establishments in Europe. To graduate, students need to complete 180 credits in three years for most majors, and 240 credits in four years for a major in Physical Therapy.

LGU has academic cooperation agreements with European universities mainly in Germany, France, and the UK.

The diplomas delivered by LGU are the bachelor's degree for all majors and the master's degree in Podotherapy for the Physical Therapy major. LGU is the first university in Lebanon to offer such a degree in collaboration with the renowned ‘Ecole de Podologie de Marseilles’.

The majors offered at LGU relate to specializations in public health, business, fine arts and education.

Faculties and Majors

LGU has a variety of majors grouped under three faculties:

Faculty of Public Health
Nursing Department 
Nutrition Department 
Physical Therapy Department 
Biomedical Technologies Department 
Medical Sciences Laboratories Department
Medical Imaging Department
Faculty of Business and Tourism 
Business Administration with concentrations in Marketing, Management, Human Resources, Information Systems, School Management, Accounting and Auditing, and Finance.
Hospital Management 
Hotel Management 
Insurance (professional program in collaboration with the prestigious CII – Chartered Insurance Institute of London) 
Tourism
Faculty of Arts and Education 
Department of Primary and Pre-school Education 
Department of Performing Arts (Film / TV) 
Department of Musicology

External links
Lebanese German University

2008 establishments in Lebanon
Educational institutions established in 2008
Universities in Lebanon